Schure is a Dutch surname. It is a variant of Schuren, which is a toponymic surname as well as an ordinary word (cf.  "to scour"). In the Netherlands, there were 39 people with the surname Schure and 272 with the surname ter Schure as of 2007. The 2010 United States Census found 169 people with the surname Schure, making it the 105,600th-most-common name in the country. This represented a decrease from 181 people (92,601st-most-common) in the 2000 Census. In both censuses, about 98% of the bearers of the surname identified as non-Hispanic white.

People
Alexander Schure (1920–2009), American academic and entrepreneur
Matthew Schure (born 1948), American academic
Vincent ter Schure (born 1979), Dutch Paralympic cyclist
Joyce Schure, costume designer

See also 
Édouard Schuré (1841–1929), French philosopher and writer

References

Dutch-language surnames